Hermenegildo António Fernandes Dinis, nicknamed Chico Dinis (born October 11, 1958) is a retired Angolan football player. He has played for Angolan side Petro de Luanda as well as for the Angolan national team.

Chico Dinis is a brother to former footballer Joaquim Dinis and basketball coach Carlos Dinis.

National team statistics

References

1958 births
Living people
Angolan footballers

Association football midfielders
Footballers from Malanje
Angola international footballers
Atlético Petróleos de Luanda players